"Keep On Dancing" is a 1993 song by Swiss artist DJ BoBo, taken from his debut album, Dance With Me (1993). It features vocals by Turkish-Swiss singer Emel Aykanat and peaked at number-one in Finland, number two in Switzerland, number five in Germany and number seven in Austria and Sweden. On the Eurochart Hot 100, it reached number ten in October 1993. Outside Europe, the song peaked at number 54 in Australia and number four in Israel. It sold to Gold in Germany.

Track listing

Charts

Weekly charts

Year-end charts

References

 

1993 singles
1993 songs
DJ BoBo songs
English-language Swiss songs
Number-one singles in Finland
Songs written by DJ BoBo